David Grove Stafford Sr. (September 26, 1897 – June 21, 1975) was an American politician. He served as a Democratic member of the Louisiana State Senate.

Born in Alexandria, Louisiana. Stafford was the grandson of brigadier general Leroy Augustus Stafford and the great-grandson of attorney and politician Thomas Overton Moore. He attended Alexandria Senior High School. Stafford attended Louisiana State University, and earned a law degree at Tulane University, also playing football for both Universities. He served in World War I.

In 1940, Stafford was elected to the Louisiana State Senate, serving until 1948. He was elected as president of the Alexandria Bar Association in 1975, two months before his death.

Stafford died in June 1975 at his home in Alexandria, Louisiana, at the age of 77. He was buried in Greenwood Memorial Park.

References 

1897 births
1975 deaths
Politicians from Alexandria, Louisiana
Democratic Party Louisiana state senators
20th-century American politicians
Burials in Louisiana
Louisiana State University alumni
Tulane University alumni